KZZF-LP (107.7 FM) was a low-power radio station broadcasting a religious format. Licensed to Klamath Falls, Oregon, United States, the station was last owned by Jesus Radio, Inc.

The Federal Communications Commission cancelled the station's license and deleted its call sign on February 2, 2022, for failure to file an application for license renewal.

References

External links
 

ZZF-LP
ZZF-LP
Radio stations established in 2005
2005 establishments in Oregon
Radio stations disestablished in 2022
2022 disestablishments in Oregon
Klamath Falls, Oregon
Defunct radio stations in the United States
Defunct religious radio stations in the United States
ZZF-LP